The Cave Buttes Dam is an earthen dam located near Cave Creek, Arizona. As a dry dam, it is the primary dam to prevent flooding in North Phoenix. Built in 1979 to replace the nearby Cave Creek Dam, it is designed to prevent flooding in the city from the Cave Creek Wash.

Gallery

References

Dams in Arizona
Buildings and structures in Phoenix, Arizona
Dams completed in 1979